Kakakhel may refer to:

 Kakakhel (tribe), a pashto tribe
 Kaka Khel, a town located in Khyber Pakhtunkhwa, Pakistan